Sandra Bermann is an American literary scholar. She is the Cotsen Professor of the Humanities and Professor of Comparative Literature at Princeton University. Her research and writing focuses on poetry, translation, and literary theory. She served as president of the American Comparative Literature Association from 2007 to 2009, and chaired Princeton’s Comparative Literature department from 1998 to 2010. In 2011, she succeeded Harvey S. Rosen as the Head of Whitman College. Bermann was succeeded by Claire F. Gmachl on July 1, 2019.

Biography 
Bermann graduated from Smith College in 1969. She pursued further studies at the University of Pavia in 1970.  From Columbia University she earned a master's degree in 1971 and a doctorate in 1976.

Bermann is married to George Bermann.

Selected works

References

External links

Living people
Princeton University faculty
Year of birth missing (living people)
Place of birth missing (living people)
Columbia University alumni
Literary scholars
Smith College alumni
University of Pavia alumni
American women academics
Comparative literature academics
20th-century American women writers
21st-century American women